Malika Jahan (meaning "Queen of the World") was a Jaisalmer princess, and wife of Mughal emperor Jahangir.

Family
Malika Jahan, whose Rajput name is unknown, was born a Jaisalmer princess, the daughter of Rawal Bhim Singh, the ruler of Jaisalmer, and a contemporary of Emperor Akbar, and in imperial service to him. He had been a man of rank and influence. She was the granddaughter of Rawal Harraj. She had three paternal uncles named Kalyan Mal, Bhakar and Sultan. Her aunt was married to Emperor Akbar in 1570, and was a mother of a daughter named Mahi Begum.

Rawal Bhim succeeded his father Harraj in 1578. After Bhim's death in 1616, he left a son named Nathu Singh, two months old, who was killed by the Bhatis. His younger brother Kalyan Mal succeeded him as Rawal.

Marriage
Jahangir married her while he was a prince, and gave her the title 'Malika Jahan', which literally means ("Queen of the world"). Jahangir notes in his memoirs that this alliance was made because her family had always been faithful to the Mughals.

In popular culture
Malika Jahan is a character in Phiroz H. Madon's  historical novel The Third Prince: A Novel (2015).

References

Year of death unknown
Mughal nobility
16th-century Indian women
16th-century Indian people
Year of birth unknown
People from Jaisalmer 
Wives of Jahangir
Indian queen consorts
Indian princesses
Rajput princesses